Lac-Pythonga is an unorganized territory in the Outaouais region of Quebec, Canada. It surrounds Lake Pythonga and is the largest of the five unorganized territories in the La Vallée-de-la-Gatineau Regional County Municipality.

The Rapid Lake First Nation reserve, located on the western shore of Cabonga Reservoir, is an enclave within this territory.

Demographics
Population trend:
 Population in 2011: 0
 Population in 2006: 0
 Population in 2001: 0

References

Unorganized territories in Outaouais